Bianca Andreescu was the defending champion, but decided not to participate this year.

Aleksandra Wozniak won the title, defeating Ellen Perez 7–6(7–4), 6–4 in the final.

Seeds

Draw

Finals

Top half

Bottom half

References
Main Draw

Challenger Banque Nationale de Gatineau
Challenger de Gatineau